Peter Basquin is an American pianist and a winner of the Montreal International Competition. He attended both Carleton College and Manhattan School of Music where his teachers were Dora Zaslavsky and William Nelson. He was the pianist of the American Composers Orchestra and is Professor Emeritus at the Hunter College.

He had solo appearances at the American and Boston Symphony Orchestras as well as Minnesota, the Westchester Philharmonic and the Hunter Symphony. His conductors during those times were Dennis Russell Davies, Paul Lustig Dunkel, Michael Tilson Thomas, and Gunther Schuller among others. He also collaborated with Lewis Kaplan, Jaime Laredo, Charles Neidich, Nathaniel Rosen, Jacques Thibaud Trio, and Frederick Zlotkin and played with Cassatt Quartet. In 1978 he recorded Marga Richter's 1954 Sonata which was published by Grenadilla Records the same year. (Richter's Sonata was first recorded in 1956 by Menahem Pressler for MGM recordings.)

References

External links
Piano Lesson

Living people
American male pianists
21st-century American pianists
21st-century American male musicians
Year of birth missing (living people)